Bucculatrix paliuricola is a moth in the family Bucculatricidae. It was described by Vladimir Ivanovitsch Kuznetzov in 1960 (sources differ: The Global Lepidoptera Names Index and Lepidoptera and Some Other Life Forms give 1956). It is found in Turkmenistan and Ukraine.

References

Bucculatricidae
Moths described in 1960
Moths of Europe
Moths of Asia
Leaf miners